The lazuli bunting (Passerina amoena) is a North American songbird named for the gemstone lapis lazuli.

Description
Measurements:

 Length: 5.1-5.9 in (13-15 cm)
 Weight: 0.5-0.6 oz (13-18 g)
 Wingspan: 8.7 in (22 cm)
The male is easily recognized by its bright blue head and back (lighter than the closely related indigo bunting), its conspicuous white wingbars, and its light rusty breast and white belly.  The color pattern may suggest the eastern and western bluebirds, but the smaller size (13–15 cm or 5–5.9 inches long), wingbars, and short and conical bunting bill quickly distinguish it.  The female is brown, grayer above and warmer underneath, told from the female indigo bunting by two thin and pale wingbars and other plumage details.

Call
The song is a high, rapid, strident warble, similar to that of the indigo bunting but longer and with less repetition.

Distribution and habitat
Lazuli buntings breed mostly west of the 100th meridian from southern Canada to northern Texas, central New Mexico and Arizona, and southern California.  On the Pacific coast their breeding range extends south to extreme northwestern Baja California. They migrate to southeastern Arizona and Mexico. Their habitat is brushy areas and sometimes weedy pastures, generally well-watered, and sometimes in towns.

Diet
They eat mostly seeds and insects. They may feed conspicuously on the ground or in bushes, but singing males are often very elusive in treetops.

Breeding
It makes a loose cup nest of grasses and rootlets placed in a bush. It lays three or four pale blue eggs. In the eastern and southern part of its range, it often hybridizes with the indigo bunting.

Gallery

References

External links 

 Lazuli bunting species account - Cornell Lab of Ornithology
 Lazuli bunting - Passerina amoena - USGS Patuxent Bird Identification InfoCenter
 Lazuli bunting videos on the Internet Bird Collection
 Lazuli bunting photo gallery VIREO (with photo of egg clutch)

lazuli bunting
Native birds of Western Canada
Native birds of the Western United States
Birds of Mexico
lazuli bunting
Birds of the Sierra Madre Occidental